Lorran de Oliveira Quintanilha (born 8 January 1996), commonly known as Lorran, is a Brazilian footballer who plays as a left back for Sociedade Imperatriz de Desportos.

Career
Lorran is a product of CR Vasco da Gama's youth academy, and he appeared in 18 competitive matches for the club. In 2015, Italian club Torino was interested in a transfer, but Lorran suffered a serious knee injury which scrapped the deal.

References

External links
Lorran at ZeroZero

1996 births
Living people
Brazilian footballers
Brazil youth international footballers
Campeonato Brasileiro Série B players
Campeonato Brasileiro Série C players
Cypriot First Division players
CR Vasco da Gama players
Moto Club de São Luís players
Esporte Clube Santo André players
Pafos FC players
2015 South American Youth Football Championship players
Association football defenders
Brazilian expatriate sportspeople in Cyprus
Expatriate footballers in Cyprus
Brazilian expatriate footballers